The McCulloch MAC-101, also called the MC-101 and MC101, is a two-stroke, single cylinder engine that was designed and produced by McCulloch Motors Corporation for kart racing use, being introduced in 1967. It was also used in the late 1970s and early 1980s as an ultralight aircraft engine.

Design and development

Variants
MC-101
 Introduced in 1967
MC-101A
 Introduced in 1969
MC-101AA
 Introduced in 1971
MC-101B
 Introduced in 1974
MC-101C
 Introduced in 1969
MC-101D
 Introduced in 1971
MC-101M/C
 Introduced in 1973

Applications
Aircraft

Specifications (MC-101B)

References

External links
Photo of two MC-101 engines
Photo of racing kart with dual MC-101 engines

Air-cooled aircraft piston engines
Two-stroke aircraft piston engines